The 2023 El Paso Locomotive FC season will be the fifth season for El Paso Locomotive FC in the USL Championship, the second tier of professional soccer in the United States and Canada.

Staff

Roster

Transfers

In

Loan In

Out

Non-competitive fixtures

Preseason

Competitive fixtures

USL Championship

Standings — Western Conference

Match results

U.S. Open Cup

References 

El Paso Locomotive FC
El Paso
El Paso
El Paso Locomotive